II is the second studio album by American rock band Fuzz, released on October 23, 2015 on In the Red Records. The album is the first to feature bass guitarist and vocalist Chad Ubovich.

Background and recording
Regarding the writing process for II, bass guitarist Chad Ubovich noted that it was a more collaborative process than the band members were used to: “We all kind of did something we’ve never done before, which was write together as a band. That was a first for all of us. Usually in our respective projects it’s all about writing on our own, and that process. This time we tried something definitely new."

Track listing

References

Fuzz (band) albums
2015 albums
In the Red Records albums